Diapaga is a city in and the capital of Tapoa Province in Burkina Faso. The main ethnic group in the city are the Gourmantché. The park headquarters for Burkina Faso are located in the town.

Notable people
Abroubagui Salbre, footballer

References

Populated places in the Est Region (Burkina Faso)